Association Sportive Dakar Sacré-Cœur is a Senegalese football club located in Dakar, Senegal.

History
AS Dakar Sacré-Cœur was founded in 2005, with the professional team beginning operation in October 2010. They are a partner of the French club Olympique Lyonnais. They have a men's team that plays in the Senegal Premier League, a women's team in the Senegalese first division, and a training center with more than 65 youth footballers. They are also associated with a football school with more than 1,800 children.

Colours
The club's colours are blue and white.

Squad

References

External links 
 AS Dakar Sacré-Cœur Website
 Soccerway Profile

Association football clubs established in 2005
2005 establishments in Senegal
Football clubs in Senegal
Sport in Dakar